Charlotte Ninon Coleman (3 April 1968 – 14 November 2001) was an English actress best known for playing Scarlett in the film Four Weddings and a Funeral, Jess in the television drama Oranges Are Not the Only Fruit, and her childhood roles of Sue in Worzel Gummidge and the character Marmalade Atkins.

Early life
Coleman was the first of two daughters born to actress Ann Beach and Canadian-born television producer Francis Coleman. Her younger sister is the actress Lisa Coleman. Charlotte was educated at Camden School for Girls, from which she was expelled. Outside regular school hours she attended classes at the Anna Scher Theatre School in Islington, north London, because she said she was "too cool" to go to the Brownies.

At 15, feeling that her upbringing had been too liberal, since her parents "didn't believe in restraint", Coleman enrolled at Dartington Hall School in Devon. It was a very progressive school where pupils "didn't have to go to any lessons, so I didn't. I spent 15 grand, all my money, and it was just stupid really". After this, she attended cookery school.

Career
Coleman's first major television role was as Sue in Southern Television's Worzel Gummidge. This ran for four seasons (and a Christmas special) from 1978 to 1981 on the ITV network. Other early work included A Choice of Evils (Play for Today, BBC, 1977) and Two People (London Weekend Television, 1979), as Emma Moffatt). She had a crush on Stephen Garlick, her co-star in Two People. For the role, she had to choose a stuffed toy for Emma to carry; she named it "Haggis" and still had it when interviewed in 1990.

This was soon followed by her role as the teenage rebel Marmalade Atkins, firstly in Marmalade Atkins in Space (a one-off drama shown in 1981), and then in two series, Educating Marmalade (1982–83) and Danger: Marmalade at Work (1984). All three were made by Thames Television and written by Andrew Davies.

In 1990, Coleman appeared as Jess, a teenage girl from Lancashire brought up by a strict Pentecostal mother, in the BBC television drama Oranges Are Not the Only Fruit, based on Jeanette Winterson's novel of the same name. Coleman won a Royal Television Society, Best Actress award and was nominated for a BAFTA for her portrayal of the young lesbian character. She also read the novel for release by BBC Audiobooks.

Other television appearances in the 1980s and '90s included roles in Thames Television's The Bill and Central Independent Television's Inspector Morse, the short-lived comedy series Freddie and Max, with Anne Bancroft, a drama about homelessness, Sweet Nothing and another lesbian role, as Barbara Gale in the political satire Giving Tongue (1996). She also appeared in Simon Nye's sitcom How Do You Want Me? (1998–2000), alongside Dylan Moran and Emma Chambers, and voiced the lead female character, Primrose, in the animated adaptation of Brambly Hedge. Coleman's final television appearance was in the adaptation of Jacqueline Wilson's Double Act, where she played the twins' teacher, Miss Debenham.

Coleman played Scarlett in the film Four Weddings and a Funeral (1994) with Hugh Grant, Simon Callow and Kristin Scott Thomas. She received a BAFTA Film Award nomination for this part, losing to Scott Thomas. Coleman continued to act in films throughout the 1990s with her last major film being Jasmin Dizdar's Beautiful People (1999), set in London in 1993, at the time of the Yugoslav Wars, playing the role of Portia Thornton.

Theatre
Coleman portrayed the character of the teenage Lorna in Our Own Kind (Roy MacGregor), at the Bush Theatre in London (April 1991). She co-starred with Kevin Whately, Nisha Nayar and Jane Horrocks.

"The prime focus falls on Sylvie's bright-eyed schoolgirl sister Lorna. Vividly brought to life by Charlotte Coleman, she's both a droll chorus figure and an optimistic, surrogate victim. The play is tightly directed by new Bush supremo Dominic Dromgoole"

Personal life
In 1987, Coleman's boyfriend, Jonathan Laycock was killed by a lorry driver whilst cycling to work. He was 23 years old. After his death Coleman went through periods of depression, and developed the eating disorders anorexia and bulimia.

Death
On 13 November 2001, Coleman visited her family where they watched a film together. Her father later stated that she had been in great spirits because of her new flat in Holloway, north London, which she had decorated, and there was a possibility of a career upturn after a few years in the doldrums. Later that evening, she complained of feeling unwell, but went home to her flat against her parents' advice. 

The next morning, Wednesday, 14 November 2001, her parents telephoned her to see if she was feeling better; but there was no reply. Concerned, her mother went to Coleman's flat only to find her lying unconscious on the floor; her asthma inhaler was in a different room. She was taken by ambulance to Whittington Hospital in north London, where she was pronounced dead on arrival from a massive attack of bronchial asthma. She was 33 years old.

A memorial was held at the Mill Hill Buddhist Centre in north London later that month and attended by family and close friends.

Charlotte Coleman Scholarship Award
The New London Performing Arts Centre introduced the Charlotte Coleman Scholarship in 2003. A showcase event is held every November from which one performer is chosen to receive the award. All NLPAC members are eligible for the prize of a year's classes in dance, drama and music.

Roles

Film
Bodywork (2001) ... Tiffany Shades
A Loving Act (2001) ... Det. Jane Thompson 
Beautiful People (1999) ... Portia Thornton
Faeries (1999) ... voice of Merrivale
If Only... (1998) aka Twice Upon a Yesterday ... Alison Hayes 
Sweet Revenge (1998) ... Norma 
Different for Girls (1996) ... Alison 
The Young Poisoner's Handbook (1995) ... Winnie 
Four Weddings and a Funeral (1994) ... Scarlett 
Map of the Human Heart (1993) ... Julie 
Bearskin: An Urban Fairytale (1989) ... Kate

Television
Double Act ... Miss Debenham; 2 June 2002, BBC (writer: Jacqueline Wilson; director: Cilla Ware)
McCready and Daughter ... Shelley Bennett in "No Bed of Roses" (1.5); Ecosse Films for BBC
How Do You Want Me? ... Lisa Lyons; 24 February 1998 – 22 December 1999, Kensington Films & Television for BBC (writer: Simon Nye; director: John Henderson)
Wycliffe ... Laura Kessell in "Bad Blood" (4.6); 3 August 1997, ITV (director: Alan Wareing)
Oliver's Travels ... Cathy; 1995, BBC Wales (writer: Alan Plater; director: Giles Foster)
The Vacillations of Poppy Carew ... Mary; 5 March 1995, (director: James Cellan Jones)
Olly's Prison ... Sheila; May 1993, BBC (writer: Edward Bond; director: Roy Battersby)
The Comic Strip Presents... ... Patsy in "Gregory: Diary of a Nutcase"; 13 May 1993 (director: Peter Richardson)
The Bill ... Sharon Palmer in "Happy Families" (8.93); 19 November 1992, ITV (director: Andrew Higgs)
Inspector Morse ... Jessica White in "Happy Families" (6.2); 11 March 1992, Zenith Entertainment for ITV (director: Adrian Shergold)
Freddie and Max ... Freddie Latham; 12 November – 18 December 1990 (director: John Stroud)
Oranges Are Not the Only Fruit ... Jess; 10–24 January 1990 (writer: Jeanette Winterson; director: Beeban Kidron)
Inappropriate Behaviour ... Helen Bardsley; 8 March 1987, BBC Two Screen Two, Season 3, Episode 10 (Writer: Andrew Davies; director: Paul Seed)
The Insurance Man ... Seamstress; 22 February 1986, BBC (Writer: Alan Bennett; director: Richard Eyre)
Danger: Marmalade at Work ... Marmalade Atkins; 20 February – 30 April 1984, Thames Television for ITV (writer: Andrew Davies; director: John Stroud)
Educating Marmalade ... Marmalade Atkins; 25 October 1982 – 3 January 1983, Thames Television for ITV (writer: Andrew Davies; directors: John Stroud, Colin Bucksey)
Marmalade Atkins in Space ... Marmalade Atkins; 2 November 1981, Thames Television for ITV (writer: Andrew Davies)
Worzel Gummidge ... Sue Peters; 25 February 1979 – 31 October 1981, Southern Television for ITV (writers: Keith Waterhouse and Willis Hall; directors: James Hill and David Pick)

References

External links

1968 births
2001 deaths
20th-century English actresses
Actresses from London
Alumni of the Anna Scher Theatre School
Respiratory disease deaths in England
Deaths from asthma
English film actresses
English television actresses
English voice actresses
People from Islington (district)
People educated at Camden School for Girls
People educated at Dartington Hall School
English people of Canadian descent
English people of American descent
20th-century British businesspeople